The COPD: Journal of Chronic Obstructive Pulmonary Disease is a peer-reviewed medical journal that covers all aspects of chronic obstructive pulmonary disease and its related conditions.

Editor-in-Chief 
The editor in chief of COPD: Journal of Chronic Obstructive Pulmonary Disease is Vito Brusasco.

References 

Publications established in 2004
Quarterly journals
English-language journals
Pulmonology journals